{{DISPLAYTITLE:C15H12O}}
The molecular formula C15H12O (molar mass: 208.26 g/mol, exact mass: 208.0888 u) may refer to:

 Chalcone
 9-Anthracenemethanol

Molecular formulas